Constanzia "Connie" Corleone (also known as Connie Corleone Rizzi) is a fictional character in The Godfather, a 1969 novel by Mario Puzo, and the 1972 film The Godfather. In the film, Connie is portrayed by Talia Shire, the sister of the director Francis Ford Coppola. Shire was nominated for the Academy Award for Best Supporting Actress for her portrayal of Connie Corleone in The Godfather Part II.

The Godfather 
Born in 1925, Connie is the youngest child and only daughter of Mafia don Vito Corleone and his wife Carmela. She is the sister of Sonny, Fredo and Michael Corleone and adopted sister of Tom. In 1945, she marries Sonny's friend Carlo Rizzi. Vito disapproves of the match, due to the fact that Carlo's mother is from Northern Italy rather than Sicily, and only agrees to the marriage on the condition that they have a traditional Sicilian wedding.

Puzo characterizes Carlo as "a punk sore at the world", and his angry behavior is exacerbated by the Corleone family shunting him aside after marrying into the family. He physically abuses and cheats on Connie. On their wedding night, he blackens Connie's eye when she refuses to give up the bridal purse containing thousands of dollars in cash wedding gifts.

Connie complains about Carlo's abuse to her family. Her brothers despise Carlo for mistreating their sister; Sonny is particularly enraged. Vito refuses to intervene and he strictly forbids anyone in the family from retaliating against Carlo. Connie is hurt and confused by this seeming indifference. Vito, however, is concerned, but feels powerless; Italian tradition forbids interfering in another person's marriage, and Vito worries his son-in-law will be unable to discharge his "duties as a husband" if he fears the family. Vito instead has Carlo secretly watched. This perceived inaction only emboldens Carlo to become more abusive. Sonny obeys his father's command not to interfere until he visits Connie and finds her sobbing and battered. Sonny severely beats Carlo in the street, threatening to kill him if he hurts Connie again.

Rival mob boss Emilio Barzini recruits Carlo in a plot to murder Sonny. Carlo arranges for his mistress to call the apartment to provoke a fight with the pregnant Connie. After Carlo severely beats Connie, she hysterically phones the Corleone compound. An enraged Sonny drives off alone to Connie's apartment, his bodyguards following in a separate car. At the causeway toll booth, Sonny is ambushed and killed by Barzini's Tommy gun-wielding men.

Michael returns from Sicily and assumes Sonny's place as Vito's heir apparent. Connie and Carlo's relationship seems to improve and they have a second child. Following Vito's death, Michael becomes the new Don and avenges Sonny's murder by having Carlo garroted by caporegime Peter Clemenza, one part of a wave of murders orchestrated by Vito and Michael to eliminate their enemies. Connie (who was unaware of her husband's role in Sonny's murder), hysterical after Carlo's death, blames Michael, denouncing him in front of his wife, Kay. In the novel, Connie quickly recovers from Carlo's demise, apparently relieved to be rid of an abusive, philandering husband. Days later, she apologizes to Michael for her outburst and assures Kay that Michael is blameless. Kay initially believes both Connie and Michael, but later learns her husband did have Carlo killed, along with the other Mafia heads.

The Godfather Part II 
In The Godfather Part II, set three years later, Connie is still angry at Michael, and has several meaningless affairs just to spite him. Michael, to his dismay, is often caretaker for Connie's children during her frequent absences. On the day of Michael's son Anthony's First Communion, she comes to Michael's house and asks for money so she can marry Merle Johnson, a man Michael disapproves of. Michael refuses, and Connie storms off. At the end of the film, Connie returns for her mother's funeral and makes peace with Michael. She intercedes on Fredo's behalf after Michael disowns him for conspiring with Corleone rival Hyman Roth, pleading with Michael to forgive him. Michael publicly appears to forgive Fredo, but later has him killed after Connie organized a visit for Kay behind Michael's back which breaks the agreement. Connie later says that Fredo had drowned, feigning ignorance of the truth. After Michael and Kay divorce, Connie helps care for Michael's children.  In a flashback at the end of the film, it is revealed that Sonny introduced her to Carlo in 1941 during Vito's birthday party.

The Godfather Part III 
In The Godfather Part III, set 20 years later, Connie has become one of Michael's closest advisors, gradually assuming an active role in Corleone Family operations. She encourages Michael to bring Sonny's illegitimate son Vincent Mancini into the Corleone family and support him in his feud with Joey Zasa. 

When Michael suffers a diabetic stroke following an attempt on his life, Connie and Michael's bodyguard Al Neri give Vincent the approval to kill Zasa, who was complicit in the attack. Michael is furious that Connie gave an order behind his back, but she maintains that it was necessary to strike fear into his enemies and prevent further hit attempts upon Michael. In a hospital room meeting with Vincent, Neri and Connie, rather than simply ordering Connie to stay out of Corleone Family illegal activities, Michael demands -- and gets -- her agreement to abide by his decisions, essentially granting her authority in family operations subject only to his own. 

Connie travels with the Corleone family to Palermo, Sicily to watch Anthony's operatic debut. Now acting with full authority, Connie tells Vincent to prepare a counterattack if Michael is killed. She then stands at Michael's side when he retires and names Vincent his successor. She attends the opera, along with the entire Corleone family. Upon discovering that her godfather Don Altobello is the mastermind of the plot against their family, she kills him by giving him a gift of poisoned cannoli.

Connie is distraught when her niece Mary is killed by an assassin who intended to kill Michael.

The Italian-language version of The Godfather Part III changes Connie's name's spelling to the far more standard and common "Costanza" rather than keeping the original "Constanzia", which is rare and archaic in Italy.

Character 
Connie is Vito's only daughter and has been described as his favorite child, next to Michael. Connie attempts to have her family accept Carlo in the first film, and is, at least initially, devastated by his murder, despite the abuse she suffered at his hands. Talia Shire described her character as "'a pain-in-the-ass, whiny person' in the shadow of all-powerful men."

In The Godfather, Part II, Connie has become an irresponsible social climber, paying scant attention to her sons while speeding through two superficial marriages, much to the disapproval of Michael.

With Vito and Sonny dead, and Fredo proving incapable of serving as any kind of family authority figure, Connie must beg Michael for money to support her party-girl lifestyle. Following the death of matriarch Carmela Corleone, Connie apparently abandons her promiscuous ways, and returns to the now-divorced Michael to assume a supportive role in his household.

By the events of The Godfather, Part III, Connie has become more decisive and self-sufficient, apparently having accepted the need for Michael to have eliminated Carlo. (Her sons by Carlo are not mentioned in the film.) 

Although still feigning ignorance of the true circumstances of Fredo's death, she rationalizes it with Michael as "God's will."

In other media 
Connie appears as a supporting character in Mark Winegardner's sequel novels The Godfather Returns and The Godfather's Revenge.

Family 
Vito Corleone — Father
Carmela Corleone — Mother
Santino 'Sonny' Corleone — Brother
Tom Hagen — Adopted brother
Fredo Corleone — Brother
Michael Corleone — Brother
Kay Adams-Corleone  Sister-in-law
Anthony Corleone — Nephew
Mary Corleone — Niece
Vincent Mancini — Nephew
Carlo Rizzi — First Husband
Victor Rizzi — Son
Michael Francis Rizzi — Son

References 

The Godfather characters
Characters in American novels of the 20th century
Characters in American novels of the 21st century
Literary characters introduced in 1969
Fictional murderers
Female characters in literature
Fictional Italian American people
Female characters in film
Cultural depictions of the Mafia
Fictional victims of domestic abuse
Fictional people from the 20th-century
Film characters introduced in 1972